The Durlin Hotel, which was renamed the Oatman Hotel, is located on Main St. in
Oatman, Arizona, United States.  It was built in 1924 by John Durlin and includes Spanish Colonial Revival architecture.

It was listed on the National Register of Historic Places in 1983.  It is significant as the only two-story adobe building in Mohave County, Arizona, and for association with the gold mining era of Oatman.

Images

References 

Buildings and structures in Mohave County, Arizona
Hotel buildings completed in 1924
Hotel buildings on the National Register of Historic Places in Arizona
Spanish Colonial Revival architecture in Arizona
National Register of Historic Places in Mohave County, Arizona